Ryan Rees (born 28 August 1998) is an American rugby union player, currently playing for the . His preferred position is scrum-half.

Early career
Rees is from Austin, Texas and attended Life University where he won two championships in 2018 and 2019.

Professional career
Rees signed for Rugby ATL ahead of the 2021 Major League Rugby season having been traded to the side after his selection in the Supplemental Collegiate Draft. He has remained with the side since.

Rees toured with the USA Falcons XV side to South Africa in 2022. He made his debut for the full United States side in 2022, making his debut against Kenya.

References

External links
itsrugby.co.uk Profile

1998 births
Living people
American rugby union players
United States international rugby union players
Rugby union scrum-halves
Rugby ATL players